Ulrika Karlsson, born in 1973, is a Swedish politician of the Moderate Party. She was member of the Riksdag from 2006 to 2018 and a replacement member of the Riksdag in 2004.

References

Ulrika Karlsson at the Riksdag website

Members of the Riksdag from the Moderate Party
Living people
1973 births
Women members of the Riksdag
21st-century Swedish women politicians